Discoglossus scovazzi, the Moroccan painted frog, in French discoglosse peint or discoglosse à ventre blanc, is a species of frog in the family Alytidae. It is found in Morocco and the Spanish North African enclaves Ceuta and Melilla.

Habitat
D. scovazzi lives near streams, cisterns, and pools of either fresh or brackish water, often in Quercus forest, Nerium oleander scrub, or near ruins. It is a relatively common species in Morocco.

Conservation and threats
Increasing pressure on agricultural land conversion and from surface water extraction to serve the expanding regional human population is placing downward pressure on this species (as well as other amphibians in the region). However, the species is not considered significantly threatened.

D. scovazzi is listed among the "Top 100 EDGE amphibians". It is believed to have diverged from its closest relative some 5–10 million years ago.

References

Discoglossus
Amphibians of North Africa
EDGE species
Amphibians described in 1878
Taxa named by Lorenzo Camerano
Taxonomy articles created by Polbot